Lunik IX may refer to:
 Luník IX, a borough in the city of Košice, Slovakia, in the Košice II district
 Luna 9, an unmanned space mission of the Soviet Union's Luna program